This is a list of hillside letters (also known as mountain monograms) in the U.S. state of California. There are at least 83 hillside letters, acronyms, and messages in the state, possibly as many as 90, although some have been removed in recent years.  Among these are the oldest letter (the C in Berkeley, 1905) and the largest letter (the L in Susanville, almost 600 feet long).

Sources

External links

Mountain Monograms, a website explaining the origins and with an incomplete list and pictures
Hillside Letters, a companion website to a book on the subject
Letters on Hills, a category on waymarking.com for geocachers

Hill figures in the United States
Lists of public art in California